Clive William Nicol, MBE (17 July 1940 – 3 April 2020) was a British-born Japanese writer. He was a long-time resident and citizen of Japan.

Early life
Nicol was born in Neath, Wales. He graduated from Tokyo University of Science.

Career
In 1958, Nicol visited the Arctic Circle to research eider ducks. He became a Canadian citizen. By the early 1960s, he was studying Shotokan karate-Do at the headquarters of the Japan Karate Association (JKA) and studied Japanese and fisheries at Nihon University. He spent 1967 to 1969 as a game warden in Ethiopia, setting up the new Semien Mountains National Park. He returned to Japan, writing a book about his Ethiopian experiences entitled From the Roof of Africa (1971).

After he took up residence in Japan, Nicol focused on writing books and other literary works. In 1980, he won the Japan Broadcasting Writer's Award for a television drama written in Japanese. He continued to be an active environmentalist and lecture about the environment, addressing issues such as deforestation and the preservation of natural environments. He was particularly interested in restoring Japan's vast woodlands. The C. W. Nicol Afan Woodland in Kurohime, Shinanomachi, Nagano Prefecture, was established in 1986.

He wrote both fiction and non-fiction books, in both Japanese and in English. His subjects included whaling (for which he went on a trip on a whaling vessel), the environment, martial arts and children's fiction. His books have been translated between English and Japanese, as well as into French, Italian, German, Mongolian, Korean and Chinese. In 2005, he was awarded an Order of the British Empire.

Nicol was the chairman of the Afan Woodland Trust. He was diagnosed with cancer in 2016, and died aged 79.

Selected works
The White Shaman
Harpoon / Isana
The Boy Who Saw the Wind
The Raven's Tale
From the Roof of Africa
Moving Zen: Karate as a Way to Gentleness
The White Hippo

Discography
 Sail Down the River (1991)
 The World of Little Twins (1992)

See also
 Hideo Levy
 David Zoppetti

References

External links 

Old Nic's Notebook: Japan Times
Afan Woodland Trust
Short Biography at abcbookworld
Ko-e Magazine Interview
BBC News: Green mission for karate master
Jeffrey Bartholet, He's Big, He's Bad, He's...Japanese? Running wild with C. W. Nicol, proud citizen, silly celebrity, and stubborn environmentalist Outside
 An Interview with C.W. Nicol: Warrior of Peace

1940 births
2020 deaths
Exophonic writers
Japanese environmentalists
Japanese people of Welsh descent
20th-century Japanese male writers
Shotokan practitioners
20th-century Welsh writers
Welsh male karateka
People who lost Canadian citizenship
Naturalized citizens of Japan
Members of the Order of the British Empire
Nihon University alumni
Welsh emigrants to Japan
People who lost British citizenship
Welsh male writers
People from Neath
Tokyo University of Science alumni